The following is a list of clubs who have played in the OB I water polo league at any time since its formation in 1904. OB I teams playing in the 2014-15 season are highlighted in green.

See also
 Országos Bajnokság I
 The bolded teams are currently playing in the 2014-15 season of the Hungarian League.
 R = Relegated from the OB I
 D = Dissolved
 List of Nemzeti Bajnokság I clubs (football)
 List of Nemzeti Bajnokság I (men's handball) clubs

References

External links
 Hungarian Water Polo Federaration 

Clubs